The 1986 Fife Regional Council election, the fourth election to Fife Regional Council, was held on 8 May 1986 as part of the wider 1986 Scottish regional elections. The election saw Labour maintaining their control of the regions 46 seat council.

Aggregate results

Ward results

References

1986 Scottish local elections
1986
May 1986 events in the United Kingdom